Brookfield Place may refer to:

 Brookfield Place (Calgary), skyscraper in Calgary, Alberta, Canada
 Brookfield Place (New York City), complex of office buildings in New York City, New York
 Brookfield Place (Perth), office tower in Perth, Western Australia
 Brookfield Place (Toronto), office tower in Toronto, Ontario, Canada